Wölpe is a river of Lower Saxony, Germany.

In front of Rethem the Weiße Graben ("White Ditch") links the Wölpe with the Alpe. The Alpe-Wolpe-Umfluter then discharges into the Aller near Wohlendorf in the borough of Rethem. The waterway has been considerably straightened. It flows through woods, grassland and cultivated fields. According to the 2000 Water Quality Chart issued by the NLWKN it is critically polluted throughout (quality class II−III).

History 

During the Middle Ages the waterway was widened into a moat for the security of the fortified position and flowed around the castle built in the 12th century. After the destruction of the site in the 17th century the castle moat and the Wölpe were filled with rubble.

About  further on near Heemsen the Wölpe flows into the wood by the site of the 9th century  castle. Here, too, the stream was probably used as part of the defences.

See also
List of rivers of Lower Saxony

References

Rivers of Lower Saxony
Rivers of Germany